The Capitol Hill Historic District in Salt Lake City, Utah, United States was listed on the National Register of Historic Places in 1982.

Description
The district was originally roughly bounded by Beck, Main and Wall Streets, 300 North, Victory Road, and Capitol Boulevard and includes the Utah State Capitol. The district was increased in 2002 to include an area roughly bounded by 300 North, 400 West, 800 North, Wall Street, and 200 West.

See also

 National Register of Historic Places listings in Salt Lake City
 Capitol Hill (Salt Lake City)

References

External links

Georgian Revival architecture in Utah
Historic districts on the National Register of Historic Places in Utah
National Register of Historic Places in Salt Lake City